The Springfield Model 1866 was the second iteration of the Allin-designed trapdoor breech-loading mechanism.  Originally developed as a means of converting rifle muskets to breechloaders, the Allin modification ultimately became the basis for the definitive Springfield Model 1873, the first breech-loading rifle adopted by the United States War Department for manufacture and widespread issue to U.S. troops.

The Model 1866 corrected problems encountered with the prototypical Springfield Model 1865, in particular a simplified and improved extractor and a superior .50 caliber centerfire cartridge (the Model 1865 used a .58 caliber rimfire cartridge with mediocre ballistics), among many other less significant changes.  It employed a robust version of the trapdoor breechblock design originated by Erskine S. Allin, Master Armorer of the Springfield Armory.

Approximately 25,000 .58 caliber Springfield Model 1863 rifled muskets were converted by Springfield Armory for use by U.S. troops, the barrels being relined and rifled to .50 caliber and the trapdoor breech system affixed.  The rifle was chambered for the powerful centerfire .50-70 Government cartridge (.50 caliber  bullet;  of black powder).  Though a significant improvement over the extractor of the Model 1865 Springfield Rifle, the Model 1866 extractor was still excessively complicated and the extractor spring was somewhat prone to breakage.  However, it is a misconception that a broken extractor disabled the weapon.  In the official 1867 government user booklet “Description and Rules for the Management of the Springfield Breech-Loading Rifle Musket, Model 1866”, the following is stated regarding a broken extractor and/or ejector: “It should be understood that the ejector and friction springs are convenient rather than necessary, and that the piece is not necessarily disabled if one or both of them should break, for the shell can be easily removed by the fingers after being loosened by the extractor hook.”  Furthermore, the cleaning rod of the rifle can be used quite effectively to remove a stuck case in an emergency.  Thus it is clear that this weapon is not as easily disabled as is sometimes believed.

The Model 1866 was issued to U.S. troops in 1867, and was a major factor in the Wagon Box Fight and the Hayfield Fight, along the Bozeman Trail in 1867. The rapid rate of fire that could be achieved disrupted the tactics of attacking Sioux and Cheyenne forces, who had faced muzzle-loading rifles during the Fetterman massacre only a few months before. The new rifles contributed decisively to the survival and success of severely outnumbered U.S. troops in these engagements.

See also
 Springfield rifle

References
 The Bozeman Trail: Historical Accounts of the Blazing of the Overland Routes, Volume II, by Grace Raymond Hebard, et al. digitized at https://books.google.com/books?id=Jc8BAAAAMAAJ – participant reports for Wagon Box Fight and Hayfield Fight.
 "The .58 and .50 Caliber Rifles and Carbines of the Springfield Armory" by Richard A. Hosmer, Published by North Cape Publications, May 2006

External links

Springfield firearms
Hinged breechblock rifles
Rifles of the United States
Guns of the American West